For the Summer Olympics there are 7 venues that have been or will be used for beach volleyball.

See also
List of Olympic venues in volleyball

References

 
Vol
Venues
Olympic
Volleyball-related lists